Cephas Yao Agbemenu (born 29 May 1951) is a Ghanaian Art Professor who teaches at the Kenyatta University in Nairobi, Kenya.  He is a sculptor and a traditional African wood carver who sees parallels between his carvings and life.

Biography

Cephas Yao Agbemenu was born on 29 May 1951 in Leklebi-Kame, in the Volta Region of Ghana, West Africa.

He grew up in Ghana, going to school where art and crafts lessons were a part of the curriculum.  He also learned farming, backyard gardening, fishing, trapping and hunting.  All requiring good coordination and visual abilities in order to complete those tasks.

Agbemenu went on to Secondary School at Evangelical Presbyterian Secondary School in Hohoe, Volta Region, where he took his Ordinary-Level School Certificate in Art, English Language, Ewe Language, Maths, General Science, Principles of Accounts, Geography.

He then attended Kpandu Secondary School, Volta Region. He completed this program with Advanced-Level School Certificate, his major subjects being Art, Economics, Geography, General Studies in the year of 1972.

in June 1976 he completed a bachelor's degree in Fine Art with First Class Honours at the Kwame Nkrumah University of Science and Technology, Kumasi, Ghana, majoring in Sculpture, Painting, Art History, English Literature, Art Appreciation and African Studies.

Agbemenu then obtained his Master of Fine Arts Degree from the State University of New York at Buffalo (February 1980). His major subject was Sculpture, including Wood Carving, P.O.P, Concrete and Bronze casting, with Painting, Drawing and Art History as his minors.

Teaching and career

Agbemenu started to teach at the Kwame Nkrumah University of Science and Technology in 1977 with Art, Sculpture and Drawing.

He has taught African Art, Sculpture, Black History in a global perspective in many different countries, along with Ceramics, African History, Culture European Art History and African Carvings.

In 1987 he started as a Senior Lecturer in the Department of Fine Art, Kenyatta University, Nairobi, Kenya.
Lecturing: Contemporary African Art; Sculpture and traditional African Wood carving.

Fulbright Scholar

Agbemenu was awarded the prestigious Fulbright Scholarship, which enabled him to visit to the United States to teach at two colleges in Pennsylvania. The first was Reading Area Community College in the city of Reading, where he gave lessons on African woodcarving and also participated in a Dialog "The Spiritual Dimension in Art" with Art Professor Tullio DeSantis on 2 March 2010.
Agbemenu has said: "It's not necessary to pursue art, but I think it's necessary to pursue artistic thinking; the thinking that there is an alternative solution."

Agbemenu then travelled to Montgomery County Community College, Social Sciences Division, Blue Bell, Pennsylvania, c/o Dr. Aaron Shatzman from January 2010 to June 2010 (Scholar-in-Residence Program).
Agbemenu taught Contemporary African Art and Culture, in addition to conducting studio classes in Traditional African Wood Carving. The basic tools used for his woodcarving classes were straight and spoon gouges, chisel, carving knife, veiner.
He was quoted as saying: "America is seen as the citadel of knowledge and power. That is why many of us chose to come to the United States for graduate studies. My presence at Montgomery County Community College will be measured in both theory and practice, in terms of cross-cultural understanding in this period of globalization."

African proverbs

Agbemenu was a member of and contributor to the African Proverbs, Stories and Sayings Committee chaired by Father Joseph Healey founded in Nairobi, Kenya. In June 2008 Professor Agbemenu was awarded a grant to compile a booklet of 100 EWE Ghana Proverbs with African Symbols as illustrations of the proverbs, translated into English. The work has been published on the www.afriprov.org website.  The Theme of "Reconciliation and Peace".

A Collection of EWE Proverbs was published with illustrations and translations by Cephas Yao Agbemenu on 1 November 2010.

References

External links
Tullio DeSantis, "The Universal Language", Readingeagle ARTology, 23 February 2010. Reading Eagle
Cephas Yao Agbemenu Information. Retrieved 25 May 2010

1951 births
Ghanaian artists
Living people
Academic staff of Kwame Nkrumah University of Science and Technology
Fulbright alumni